TWA Flight 843 (TW843, TWA843) was a scheduled Trans World Airlines passenger flight that crashed after an aborted takeoff from John F. Kennedy International Airport (New York) to San Francisco International Airport (California) in July 1992. Despite an intense fire after the crash, the crew was able to evacuate all 280 passengers from the aircraft. There was no loss of life, however the aircraft was destroyed by the fire.

Aircraft and crew 

The aircraft involved was a 20-year-old Lockheed L-1011 Tristar 1 that had first flown in 1972. It had been leased to Eastern Air Lines, Five Star Airlines, and American Trans Air. The aircraft was powered by three Rolls-Royce RB211-22B turbofan engines.

The captain was 54-year-old William Kinkead, a veteran TWA pilot who had been with the airline since 1965 and had 20,149 flight hours, including 2,397 hours on the L-1011 TriStar. He had also previously served with the United States Air Force. The first officer was 53-year-old Dennis Hergert, another veteran TWA pilot who had joined the airline in 1967 and had 15,242 flight hours with 5,183 of them on the L-1011 TriStar; 2,953 of which were as a first officer and 2,230 as a flight engineer. The flight engineer was 34-year-old Charles Long, another former U.S. Air Force pilot who joined TWA in 1988. He was the least experienced member of the flight crew but still had sufficient flight experience, having clocked up a total of 3,922 flight hours, 2,266 of which were on the L-1011 TriStar. He was the head L1011 Flight Engineer instructor in the NY domicile.

Accident 
At 17:16:12 EST, Flight 843 pushed back from the gate at JFK and taxied to runway 13R. The flight was cleared for takeoff at 17:40:10 with first officer Hergert as the pilot flying. The aircraft reached V1 (the speed at which takeoff can no longer be safely aborted) and VR (rotation speed) at 17:40:58 and 17:41:03, respectively. The first abnormality was indicated at 17:41:11 when the stick shaker activated. First officer Hergert said, "Gettin' a stall. You got it," transferring control of the aircraft back to captain Kinkead, who aborted the takeoff just six seconds after rotation. The aircraft then slammed back onto the runway having reached a maximum speed of  during the attempted takeoff. Air traffic control (ATC) warned Flight 843 of "numerous flames" coming from the engines. The flight crew activated the thrust reversers and applied maximum braking without any effect, and the aircraft to continue rolling towards a blast fence at the end of the runway. Captain Kinkead turned the now-burning aircraft to the left and it went off the runway, finally stopping on an area of grass  from runway 13R.

In addition to the nine flight attendants on board, there were five additional off-duty flight attendants who assisted in the evacuation. Although only three of eight exit doors were available for use, the evacuation was completed within two minutes, and the airport rescue and fire fighting teams response was timely and adequate.

Oakland rapper Saafir was a passenger on the plane and injured his back while jumping to the ground. Only 10 people (all of whom were passengers) were injured.

Investigation 
The National Transportation Safety Board (NTSB) attributed the crash to pilot error and TWA training and maintenance issues. According to the report, the take-off was improperly aborted by the first officer shortly after liftoff, due to the erroneous activation of the stick shaker stall warning device, when in fact the aircraft was performing normally and could have taken off safely. The extremely hard landing caused damage to the right wing, spilling fuel that was then ingested into the engines and started the fire. The NTSB praised captain Kinkead for bringing the aircraft to a safe stop, the rest of the crew (including the off-duty flight attendants) for safely evacuating the aircraft, and the airport rescue and fire fighting services for responding in a timely and adequate manner. At the same time however, the NTSB also criticized the flight crew for deciding to abort the takeoff after V1 and their response to the stick-shaker activation, both of which were inappropriate.

See also
 Aviation accidents and incidents
 2008 South Carolina Learjet 60 crash, another high-speed aborted take-off
 Kenya Airways Flight 431, another accident caused by a false stall warning
 Tower Air Flight 41, another accident that occurred during take-off from JFK

References

External links 
First-person account by flight attendant Kaye Chandler

Aviation accidents and incidents in the United States in 1992
1992 in New York City
843
Accidents and incidents involving the Lockheed L-1011
Airliner accidents and incidents in New York City
1990s in Queens
July 1992 events in the United States
John F. Kennedy International Airport
Airliner accidents and incidents caused by maintenance errors
Airliner accidents and incidents caused by instrument failure
Airliner accidents and incidents caused by mechanical failure
Airliner accidents and incidents caused by pilot error